The Amboy Dukes is the debut studio album by American rock band The Amboy Dukes.  It was released in November 1967 on Mainstream Records (stereo S/6104, mono 56104). The Amboy Dukes interested a record label that primarily produced jazz albums. Ted Nugent assembled a new band of local Detroit players to secure a recording contract with them. He immediately brought in the soulful baritone voice of John (J.B.) Drake as lead vocalist. He had a long history with Drake in a local band called The Lourds. Nugent and Drake then recruited the remaining players. Steve Farmer was known as a rhythm guitarist, lyricist, composer and vocalist and was a natural fit with Nugent. He came from a local group called The Gang. Dave Palmer was a drummer and percussionist with experience in two local bands, The Galaxy Five and The Citations. Bill White played bass guitar and Rick Lober was an eclectic keyboardist rounding out the new group.

The album featured seven group composed originals with six of them composed by the emerging songwriting team of Nugent & Farmer. This album features a soulful, bluesy, psychedelic garage sound throughout. Included was their first single "Baby, Please Don't Go", a cover of a delta blues song by Big Joe Williams which charted. Also included were a cover from The Coasters along with covers of British groups Cream and The Who.

A remastered CD reissue was released in 1992 by Mainstream Direct Ltd, with one bonus track (MDCD 910).

Track listing

Personnel

The Amboy Dukes
John (J.B.) Drake – vocals
Ted Nugent – guitar
Steve Farmer – guitar
Rick Lober – piano, organ
Dave Palmer – drums
Bill White – bass

Technical
Bob Shad – producer
John Cue – engineer
Maxine Epstein – album coordinator
Jack Lonshein – cover design

References 

1967 debut albums
The Amboy Dukes albums
Mainstream Records albums
Albums produced by Bob Shad